Anthony Borg Barthet (born 25 March 1947 in Valletta, Malta) is a Maltese judge at the European Court of Justice, and former Attorney General of Malta.

Biography
He was born 25 March 1947 in Valletta, Malta to Victor Borg and Mary Barthet and is a nephew of the famous Maltese Artist Esprit Barthet (1919–1999) and has five siblings: Anna; Henry; Charles; Victor; Paul.  He married Carmen Busuttil in 1974 and has three children Jacque; Maria Paula; and Justin.

Following spinal injury in 1960 – disabled left leg – Stoke Mandeville Hospital – Rehabilitation Centre – Aylesbury, England.

He graduated in law in 1974 and joined the Civil Service in 1975. He transferred to the Malta Attorney General's office in 1978. He was Senior Counsel to the Republic in 1979 and assistant Attorney General in 1988. He was appointed to the post of Attorney General in 1989.

Education
The Lyceum and then at the University of Malta. He was president of the students’ council between 1970 and 1971.

Degrees and diplomas
1972 – Diploma Notary Public
1973 – Doctor of Laws

Awards and scholarships
Holder of Redifusion Scholarship at Royal University of Malta 1968–71.

Extra curricular and other
Active member of Student Representative Council at Royal University of Malta (1968–1972), Secretary General (1968–1970), President 1971 Student Representative Faculty Board of Laws, Senate and Council.

Professional activity

Admitted to the bar in Malta 1974
1974–1975 – private practice as Advocate – Valletta
1975–1978 – Notary to Government
1978–1979 – Counsel for the Republic
1979–1988 – Senior Counsel for the Republic
1988–1989 – Assistant Attorney General
1989–2004 – Attorney General

appeared for the Government of Malta in Civil and Constitutional Cases. Prosecuted before the Higher Criminal Courts in Malta.

Agent for the Government before the European Court of Human Rights, Strasbourg.

Represented Government of Malta in various committees of Council of Europe, at Commonwealth Law Ministries Conferences (New Zealand, Mauritius, Trinidad), European Minister of Justice Conferences (The Hague, Ottawa, Istanbul, Nicosia, Bucharest, Moldova, Lugano, Budapest, London, Prague, Malta, Morocco, Sofia) and at other meetings and in bilateral negotiations, co-chaired joint meetings OECD -Co-operative Jurisdiction on unfair tax practices.

Merits

Honorary member of Romanian Union of Jurists since 1995. He is also an Official of the Italian Ordine al Merito della Repubblica, an award given by Italian President Scalfaro in 1995.

Other activities

1987–1990 – Part-time lecturer in Civil Law, University of Malta
1994–2004 – Member Commission for the Administration  of Justice
1998–2004 – Member Council University of Malta, Formerly member of Faculty Board of Laws
1998–2004 – Member of the Board of Governors of the Malta Arbitration Centre
2000–2004 – Member of the Council of St John's Co-Cathedral Foundation

Orders and decorations
1995 – Cavaliere Gran Ufficiale Ordine al Merito (Italy)
2000 – Cavaliere Gran Ufficiale Ordine Pro Merito Melitense (Sovereign Military Order of Malta)
2001 – Officer of Merit (Malta)
2004 – Cavaliere Gran Croce Ordine al Merito (Italy)

See also
List of members of the European Court of Justice

References

External links
Interview with Malta Today
Notice of Appointment

1947 births
Living people
European Court of Justice judges
People from Valletta
Maltese politicians
Maltese judges of international courts and tribunals